The Gael Linn Cup is a bi-ennial tournament, representative competition for elite level participants in the women's team field sport of camogie, contested by Ireland's four provincial teams with competitions at senior and junior level on alternate years. The tournament has existed in various guides since 1956, currently the senior tournament is played in even years and the junior tournament in odd years. An inter-provincial colleges competition is also played at secondary school/high school level.

Table of winners
Click on the year for details and team line-outs.

History
Interprovincial camogie matches were played as part of the 1928 and 1932 Tailteann Games programmes and a further inter-provincial match was played in July 1954 in Navan as part of the 50th anniversary celebrations of the Camogie Association. Munster beat Ulster by 8–3 to 5–3 in a match that was described as the best of the year.

The enthusiasm generated by the match at Navan led to the establishment of an annual inter-provincial competition two years later, with the first final between Leinster and Ulster at Knockbridge, Co Louth. Leinster has dominated the series with 26 titles, followed by Munster with 20. Connacht won four titles in 1973, 1974, 2000 and 2008 and Ulster won two in 1967 and 2007.

Experiments
In 1993 and 1994 the Gael Linn Cups were played with teams of 15-a-side for a two-year experimental period, as a prelude to the increase in team size form 12 to 15 in 1999 for all matches.

Two competitions
The series was played as a junior competition between 1974 and 1976. Senior and junior competitions were run concurrently from 1977. The competition format was moved to a single weekend in October/November during 1985-88 and again since 1999. The date was moved to June in 1995, back to October/November in 2004 and to May since 2008. As with the Railway Cups in Gaelic Football and Hurling, the competition has been popular with players but survived several attempts to abolish the series since 1986.

Shwarzkopf hair products sponsored the competition from 1999 to 2004. In 2009, after the withdrawal of Ulster the series was played in a blitz format with 30 minute games. 
In 2010 it was decided to alternate the competition between junior and senior status and the senior competition was restored to full match status with four provinces contesting the semi-finals. In the absence of Antrim players an all Derry side represented Ulster in the 2010 semi-final.

Players
Players who won Gael Linn Cup medals who never won All Ireland titles include Kathleen Griffin, Lily Parle, Lilian Howlett, Nono McHugh, Claire Hanrahan, Vera Mackey, Pat Crangle and Josie Kelly, affording them valuable recognition in the days before the Camogie All Stars Awards were inaugurated. Geraldine Callinan (2 Gael Linn Interprovincial Medals)Geraldine Callinan was the youngest ever Leinster player at 14 years of age. Scored 3 goals and was instrumental in winning the match after being 11 points down at half time.

Highlights and incidents
 Clare player Patricia O'Grady's solo performance in the 1990 final when she scored 9–1 against Ulster at Ballyholland, one of the outstanding scoring exhibitions, not just in the competition but in the history of the game.
 Among the first camogie matches to be filmed for television packages were two Gael Linn Cup semi-finals at Casement Park, Belfast in 1959 and Carrickmacross in 1963.
 Joan Gormley's last-minute goal for Leinster against Munster in the 1983 final at Ballinlough.
 The 1996 final which produced ten goals, an amazing Munster comeback from eight points down to force the match into extra time and went on to win by 4–18 to 6–10.
 The 1997 final in which Leinster were in front by four points with ten minutes to go, for the second successive year Munster came back to equalise and scored 3–7 in extra-time to take the trophy.
 The 7-38 scored by Munster against Leinster in the 1999 semi-final, the highest scoreline in the history of the tournament.
 The dramatic finale to the 2006 final when two late points snatched victory for Leinster against Munster.

Gael Linn Cup Senior Inter-Provincial Finals
The first figure is the number of goals scored (equal to 3 points each) and the second total is the number of points scored, the figures are combined to determine the winner of a match in Gaelic games.

Gael Linn Cup Finals
Click on the year for details and team lineouts.

 1956 Leinster 7-01 Ulster 3-01 Knockbridge
 1957 Leinster 5-01 Munster 3-01 Cahir
 1958 Leinster 5-02 Ulster 3-03 Parnell Park
 1959 Leinster 6-00 Ulster 1-03 Casement Park
 1960 Leinster 4-06 Munster 3-01 Cahir
 1961 Munster 5-02 Connacht 1-00 Pearse Stadium
 1962 Leinster 7-02 Ulster 5-09 Casement Park
 1963 Munster 3-02 Leinster 2-02 Gorey
 1964 Munster 2-08 Leinster 3-02 Cahir
 1965 Leinster 4-03 Ulster 4-01 Casement Park
 1966 Munster 4-02 Leinster 1-03 Carrickmacross
 1967 Ulster 5-04 Leinster 5-01 Parnell Park
 1968 Leinster 7-00 Ulster 2-05 Croke Park
 1969 Leinster 5-04 Munster 2-02 Cahir
 1970 Leinster 12-02 Ulster 4-01 Carrickmacross
 1971 Leinster 6-04 Ulster 0-05 Parnell Park
 1972 Leinster 7-07 Connacht 4-02 Sligo
 1973 Connacht 4-04 Leinster 3-03 Parnell Park
 1974 Connacht 3-07 Munster 3-00 Ballinasloe
 1975-7 Played at junior level only
 1978 Leinster 4-08 Connacht 2-02 Mobhi Road
 1979 Leinster 1-05 Munster 0-04 Athboy
 1980 Munster 2-05 Leinster 2-01 St John's Park
 1981 Leinster 3-10 Ulster 2-04 Russell Park
 1982 Munster 3-10 Leinster 2-12 Mobhi Road
 1983 Leinster 2-07 Munster 1-07 Ballinlough
 1984 Leinster 3-09 Connacht 1-04 Silver Park Kilmacud
 1985 Leinster 4-09 Leinster 0-05 Páirc Uí Chaoimh
 1986 Leinster 4-10 Connacht 1-04 Silver Park Kilmacud
 1987 Leinster 8-11 Connacht 0-05 Silver Park Kilmacud
 1988 Leinster 2-09 Connacht 2-04 Silver Park Kilmacud
 1989 Leinster 5-12 Munster 3-06 Silver Park Kilmacud
 1990 Munster 10-10 Ulster 1-02 Ballyholland
 1991 Leinster 5-12 Munster 0-07 O'Toole Park
 1992 Munster 1-18 Leinster 2-09 O'Toole Park
 1993 Leinster 6-14 Ulster 1-04 Clane
 1994 Munster 4-11 Ulster 2-07 Silver Park Kilmacud
 1995 Munster 4-13 Connacht 3-10 Russell Park,
 1996 Munster 4-18 Ulster 6-10 (extra time) Russell Park
 1997 Munster 5-15 Leinster 1-14 (extra time) Russell Park
 1998 Munster 6-20 Leinster 1-11 St Vincents
 1999 Munster 1-18 Connacht 1-09 Bohernabreena
 2000 Connacht 1-10 Ulster 0-03 Bohernabreena
 2001 Munster 1-18 Connacht 1-08 Bohernabreena
 2002 Munster 7-23 Ulster 0-11 Bohernabreena
 2003 Munster 3-13 Ulster 1-09 Portmarnock
 2004 Munster 1-16 Connacht 1-09 Kilmacud
 2005 Munster 3-14 Connacht 2-8 Ballinteer
 2006 Leinster 2-07 Munster 1-08 Navan
2007 Ulster 2-12 Leinster 3-08 Russell Park
 2008 Connacht 1-14 Munster 2-10 Ashbourne
 2009 Munster 0-07 Connacht 0-02 Ashbourne
2010 Leinster 3-17 Munster 1-14 Trim.
 2012
 2013
 2014
 2015

Gael Linn Trophy
Click on the year for details and team lineouts.

Gael Linn Trophy Finals

 1975 Munster 5-01 Ulster 2-00 Adare
 1976 Leinster 2-06 Munster 2-03 Adare
 1977 Munster 3-07 Connacht 3-01 Adare
 1978 Munster 2-02 Ulster 2-01 Mobhi Road
 1979 Ulster 0-04 Munster 1-00 Mobhi Road
 1980 Munster 1-09 Leinster 3-02 St John's Park
 1981 Connacht 2-03 Munster 2-02 Russell Park
 1982 Leinster 3-16 Connacht 2-08 Mobhi Road
 1983 Munster 1-12 Leinster 1-11 Ballinlough
 1984 Leinster 3-06 Ulster 1-03 Silver Park Kilmacud
 1985 Munster 1-07 Ulster 2-03 Páirc Uí Chaoimh
 1986 Leinster 5-06 Connacht 4-03 Silver Park Kilmacud
 1987 Munster 2-06 Ulster 2-05 Silver Park Kilmacud
 1988 Munster 4-03 Leinster 3-05 Silver Park Kilmacud
 1989 Ulster 1-11 Leinster 2-03 Silver Park Kilmacud
 1990 Ulster 5-11 Munster 5-03 Ballyholland
 1991 Ulster 4-05 Munster 0-06 O'Toole Park
 1992 Munster 6-11 Connacht 3-03 O'Toole Park
 1993 Ulster 4-05 Leinster 1-09 Clane
 1994 Munster 5-09 Ulster 2-12 Silver Park Kilmacud
 1995 Connacht 1-09 Munster 0-10 Russell Park,
 1996 Munster 3-17 Ulster 1-07 Russell Park
 1997 Munster 3-11 Leinster 2-10 Russell Park
 1998 Ulster 3-12 Leinster 1-12 St Vincents
 1999 Leinster 3-17 Connacht 4-06 Bohernabreena
 2000 Ulster 1-10 Munster 2-06 Bohernabreena
 2001 Leinster 1-14 Munster 1-11 Bohernabreena
 2002 Ulster 4-11 Leinster 1-13 Bohernabreena
 2003 Munster 4-07 Ulster 0-05 Portmarnock
 2004 Munster 4-16 Leinster 1-04 Silver Park Kilmacud
 2005 Munster 2-14 Ulster 2-04 Ballinteer
 2006 Connacht 3-12 Ulster 1-17 Navan
 2007 Leinster 3-16 Munster 0-11 Russell Park
 2008 Munster 3-17 Ulster 0-03 Ashbourne
 2009 Connacht 4-04 Munster 2-02
 2011 Munster 1-15 Leinster 2-11 St Jude's

Leinster
Leinster won the first five competitions, have won five in a row and seven-in-a-row since then, and have fielded players from nine of the province's 12 counties on victorious teams. 
The first winning Leinster team:
Kathleen Woods (Louth), May Kavanagh (Wicklow), Claire Monaghan (Kildare), Ettie Kearns (Meath), May Kavanagh (Dublin), Lily Parle (Wexford), Annette Corrigan (Dublin), Kathleen Mills (Dublin), Fran Maher (Dublin), Mary O'Sullivan (Dublin), Una O'Connor (Dublin), Kay Douglas (Wicklow), Subs: Kathleen Duffy (Louth), Madge Quigley (Louth), Brigid Judge (Kildare).

Munster
Munster won their first competition on a sodden field at Salthill in 1961, in the year Connacht surprisingly inflicted Leinster's first defeat in the competition.
Honor Flynn (Tipperary), Josie McNamara (Waterford), Joan Clancy (Cork), Pat Doyle  (Waterford), Bridie Scully (Tipperary), Kathleen Griffin (Tipperary, captain), Lil Coughlan (Cork), Tess Moloney (Tipperary), Kathleen Downes (Tipperary), Eithne Neville (Limerick).

Ulster
Maeve Gilroy was the star in Ulster's first success in the 1967 at Parnell Park, achieved with ten players from Antrim and two from Down. 
The team was: Teresa Cassidy (Antrim), Moya Forde (Antrim), Moira Caldwell (Down), Maeve Gilroy (Antrim, captain), Kathleen Kelly (Antrim), Mairéad McAtamney (Antrim), Sue Cashman (Antrim), Pat Craigie (Down), Marion McFettridge (Antrim), Mairéad Quinn (Antrim), Eileen Collins (Antrim), Lily Scullion (Antrim).

Connacht
Connacht's breakthrough victory came in 1973, when an all Galway side defeated an all-Cork Munster side 1–6 to 1–1 in a replayed semi-final described in the Connacht Tribune as a “one of the best exhibitions of the game for many a year” and then beat Leinster in the final by a single point at Parnell Park, Dublin. 
The winning team was: Margaret Killeen, Mary Kilkenny, Claire Collins, Kathleen Quinn, Rosemary Divilly, Nono McHugh, Josie Kelly, Catherine Ward, Ann Donohue, Phil Foye, Jane Murphy, Margaret Murphy.

Team for 1954 revival
The teams for the 1954 revival match at Navan were:

See also
 Interprovincial Championship
 All-Ireland Senior Camogie Championship

References

External links
 Official website of camogie
 History of Camogie slideshow. presented by Cumann Camógaíochta Communications Committee at GAA Museum January 25, 2010 part one, part two, part three and part four
 Camogie on official GAA website
 Timeline: History of Camogie 

Camogie cup competitions